Scheana Marie Shay (born May 7, 1985), known mononymously as Scheana, is an American television personality, actress and singer. Since 2013, she has been a cast member on the Bravo reality television series Vanderpump Rules.

Early life and education
Scheana was born Scheana Marie Jancan, and graduated with the class of 2002 from Bishop Amat Memorial High School in La Puente, California. In 2006, she graduated with a bachelor's degree in broadcast journalism from Azusa Pacific University. She worked at Hooters during her late teenage years.

Career 

She began her acting career with guest appearances on television shows Greek, Jonas, Victorious and 90210. In 2012, she portrayed Angel Tomlin on three episodes of the anthology television series Femme Fatales.

In 2013, she became a regular cast member of reality television series Vanderpump Rules, a spin-off of The Real Housewives of Beverly Hills. The series follows the lives of SUR and TomTom servers in West Hollywood, California. During her time on Vanderpump Rules, Shay has released several dance-pop singles, most notably Good as Gold.

In 2018, Shay relocated to Las Vegas for several months and starred in a stage show called Sex Tips for Straight Women from a Gay Man at Anthony Cools Theater at Paris Las Vegas. She replaced Kendra Wilkinson in the role of Robyn.

She hosts a weekly podcast titled Scheananigans with Scheana Shay.

Personal life 
Shay was part of a lawsuit against Hooters where she was secretly filmed while undressing in 2004.

Shay married Michael Shay on July 27, 2014, at Hummingbird Nest Ranch in Santa Susana, California after knowing each other for over a decade. The couple announced their separation in November 2016 and finalized their divorce in April 2017.

After her divorce, Shay decided to freeze her eggs. For the six weeks before her egg retrieval procedure, Shay said she stopped drinking, smoking marijuana, and having sex. She was successfully able to harvest 12 eggs. In 2019, Shay froze her eggs again less than a year after undergoing the procedure for the first time.

After suffering a miscarriage with boyfriend, Brock Davies, Shay announced on October 28, 2020, that she was expecting her first child in April 2021. The couple’s daughter was born on April 26, 2021. Shay married Brock Davies on August 23, 2022, at Dreams Natura Resort & Spa in Cancún, Mexico.

Filmography

References

External links

1985 births
Living people
American female models
21st-century American actresses
Television personalities from California
American women television personalities
People from West Covina, California